The SDA Language School is an English language school with 35 branches across South Korea. There is also a branch in Mongolia. About 25,000 students enroll each term and about 180 native English speakers are employed by the school. It is the largest English language school in South Korea and is owned by the Seventh-day Adventist Church.

History 
The SDA Language Institute was founded in 1969 by several missionaries from the United States. Today, it operates under the supervision of the General Conference and the Northern Asia Pacific Division and operated by the Korean Union Conference. It is the fastest growing language school in South Korea and is involved in many mission outreach projects. The school teaches English and Bible classes to over 25,000 students and organizes worship services, and Bible clubs and bi-annual Bible camps.

See also 
Sahmyook University
Sahmyook Foods
Sahmyook Medical Center

References

External links 
 

Seventh-day Adventist education